Zsuzsa Budavari-Novak (born 1978 in Kecskemét) is a Hungarian conductor and current leader of the Maribor Academic Choir in Slovenia.

Biography 

Following primary and secondary school, Zsuzsa Budavari-Novak studied music teaching and conducting at the University of Music in Pécs. During this time she gained considerable experience as a teacher at various music schools and initially became the conductor of the female choir Cantikum Cydrel which not only performed many concerts in Pecs but toured all over Hungary. She also sang with the vocal group Bach Singers.

Zsuzsa Budavari-Novak studied music at the Faculty of Arts in Pécs and the Academy of Music in Budapest, and graduated from both institutions in 2001.

Following graduation, Zsuzsa Budavari-Novak moved to Slovenia, first working with the Vokalischoir, and then with male octet Osmica she created.

Since 2002, Zsuzsa Budavari-Novak has been the conductor of the Maribor Academic Choir. The Maribor Academic Choir has toured to a number of European countries such as the UK, the Netherlands, Germany, France and Austria.

Awards 

1986: Gold medal in Cork, Ireland
1995: Gold medal in Pardubice, Czech Republic
2004: Awarded at the University Choir Festival in Bologna
2004: Awarded at the International Choir Competition in Jersey

References

Hungarian conductors (music)
Slovenian conductors (music)
Hungarian emigrants to Slovenia
People from Kecskemét
1978 births
Living people
Date of birth missing (living people)
21st-century conductors (music)